Parineeti Chopra is an Indian actress who appears in Hindi films. Chopra has 24 awards to her credit including a National Film Award, one each from the Filmfare, Screen and Zee Cine Awards, and two awards each from the Producers Guild and International Indian Film Academy Awards (IIFA).

Chopra made her film debut with a supporting role in the 2011 romantic comedy Ladies vs Ricky Bahl, which won her the Best Female Debut at the 57th Filmfare Awards. She also received Best Debut awards at other ceremonies, including Screen Awards, IIFA Awards, Producers Guild Film Awards, and Zee Cine Awards. Additionally, Chopra won the IIFA Award for Best Supporting Actress, and the Producers Guild Film Award for Best Actress in a Supporting Role, and was nominated in the same category at the Filmfare, Screen, and Zee Cine award ceremonies for her performance in the film. In 2012, she played her first lead role in the romantic drama Ishaqzaade, for which she earned a Special Mention at the 60th National Film Awards. For the film, Chopra also received her first nomination for the Filmfare Award and Producers Guild Film Award for Best Actress in a Leading Role, among other honours.

In 2013, she starred in the romantic comedy–drama Shuddh Desi Romance, for which she received her first nomination for the Zee Cine Award for Best Actor – Female, and her second Best Actress nomination at Filmfare, Screen and Producers Guild . For her portrayal of a mad scientist in the 2014 romantic comedy Hasee Toh Phasee, Chopra received her third nomination for the Screen Award for Best Actress, and won the BIG Star Entertainment Award for Most Entertaining Actress in a Comedy Film. The same year, she was also nominated for the Stardust Award for Best Actress in a Comedy or Romance for her performance in the social–comedy Daawat–e–Ishq. She won Stardust Award for Star of the Year – Female for her performance in Kill Dil. Chopra made her singing debut in 2017 with Meri Pyaari Bindu's acclaimed song Maana Ke Hum Yaar Nahin, receiving praise for her voice and a nomination at 10th Mirchi Music Awards for Upcoming Female Vocalist of The Year.

In 2022, Chopra for her performance in Sandeep Aur Pinky Faraar, received nomination for Best Actress in a Leading Role at 7th FOI Online Awards and her third Best Actress nomination at Filmfare awards. In addition to this, she has been awarded Vogue Beauty Awards, Youth Icon Of The Year and Gr8 Women Awards for her Contribution to Cinema. In 2023, she received British Council’s India UK Achievers Honours for Outstanding  Achiever in the category of  Arts, Entertainment & Culture.

BIG Star Entertainment Awards
The BIG Star Entertainment Awards is an annual event organised by the Reliance Broadcast Network. Chopra has received one award from six nominations.

FICCI Frames Excellence Honours
The FICCI Frames Excellence Honours is an annual award ceremony organised by the Federation of Indian Chambers of Commerce and Industry. Parineeti has won one awards.

Filmfare Awards
The Filmfare Awards are presented annually by The Times Group for excellence of cinematic achievements in Hindi cinema. Chopra has received one award from five nominations.

Gold Awards
Chopra has one nomination at the Gold Awards.

International Indian Film Academy Awards
The International Indian Film Academy Awards (shortened as IIFA) is annual international event organised by the Wizcraft International Entertainment Pvt. Ltd. to honour excellence in the Hindi cinema. Chopra has won both nominations.

Mirchi Music Awards

National Film Awards
The National Film Awards is the most prestigious film award ceremony in India, considered to be the equivalent of the Academy Awards. Established in 1954, it is administered by the International Film Festival of India and the Indian government's Directorate of Film Festivals. The awards are presented by the President of India. Chopra has received one award.

People's Choice Awards India
The People's Choice Awards India is the Indian version of the American awards show recognising Indian film, television, music and sports. Chopra has received one award from two nominations.

Producers Guild Film Awards
The Producers Guild Film Awards (previously known as Apsara Film & Television Producers Guild Awards) is an annual event organised by the Film Producers Guild of India. Chopra has won two awards from five nominations.

Screen Awards
The Screen Awards are annually presented by the Indian Express Limited to honour excellence of cinematic achievements in Hindi and Marathi cinema. Chopra has received one award from seven nominations.

Stardust Awards
The Stardust Awards are an annual event organised by Magna Publishing Company Limited to honour excellence in the Hindi cinema. Chopra has won four awards from eight nominations.

Zee Cine Awards
The Zee Cine Awards are an annual award ceremony organised by the Zee Entertainment Enterprises. Chopra has received one award from three nominations.

Other awards

Media recognitions

References

External links
 

Lists of awards received by Indian actor